I'll Be Your Everything may refer to:

 "I'll Be Your Everything" (Youngstown song)
 "I'll Be Your Everything" (Tommy Page song)